Phyllostylon orthopterum is a species of plant in the family Ulmaceae. It is endemic to Bolivia.  It is threatened by habitat loss.

References

Flora of Bolivia
orthopterum
Vulnerable plants
Taxonomy articles created by Polbot